Ptericoptus avanyae is a species of beetle in the family Cerambycidae. It was described by Martins and Galileo in 2010. It is known from Brazil.

References

Ptericoptus
Beetles described in 2010